Genevievella is a genus of trilobites with a short inverted egg-shaped outline, a wide headshield, small eyes, and long genal spines. The backrim of the headshield is inflated and overhangs the first of the 9 thorax segments. The 8th thorax segment from the front bears a backward directed spine that reaches beyond the back end of the exoskeleton. It has an almost oval tailshield with 5 pairs of pleural furrows. It lived during the Upper Cambrian in what are today Canada and the United States.

Distribution 
 G. caelata is known from the Upper Cambrian of Australia (Mindyallan, Upper beds Member, Mungerbar Formation, Glenormiston, Queensland, 22.9° S, 138.8° E).
 G. simon, G. cuniculaena, G. raggedi and G. campbellina have been found in the Upper Cambrian of Canada (Dresbachian, Rabbitkettle Formation, Yukon, 62.7° N, 128.4° W).
 G. campbellina occurs in the Upper Cambrian of the United States (Merioneth: Warriorsmark, Huntingdon, Huntingdon; Warrior Formation, near Waddle, Centre County, all Pennsylvania, 40.8° N, 77.9° W) 
 G. spinox has been excavated from the Upper Cambrian of the United States (Dresbachian, Coosella zone, Riley Formation, Central Texas, 30.3° N, 97.7° W) 
 G. bigranulosa is present in the Upper Cambrian of China (Guzhangian, Glyptagnostus stolidotus trilobite zone and Paibian, Glyptagnostus reticulatus trilobite zone, both Huaqiao Formation, Hunan, 28.4° N, 109.5° E).

References

Llanoaspididae
Cambrian trilobites
Fossils of the United States
Fossils of Canada
Paleontology in Yukon
Paleozoic life of Yukon